Meymand (also Romanized as Maimand; also known as Meyman) is a city and capital of Meymand District, in Firuzabad County, Fars Province, Iran.  At the 2006 census, its population was 8,615, in 2,138 families.

Its population is almost wholly occupied with the manufacture and sale of rose water, which is largely exported to many parts of Iran as well as to Arabia, India and Java. Shafaq cave is located nearby. The district also produces great quantities of almonds.

In 1961, Meymand became a city after consensus with the three villages of Meymand-e Sofla, Meymand-e Olya and Shabankareh.

Gallery

See also

Meymand, Kerman

References

Populated places in Firuzabad County
Cities in Fars Province